Hosokawa (typically , meaning "narrow river" or "little river") is a Japanese surname. 

People with the name include:

Bill Hosokawa (1915–2007), Japanese American author and journalist
Chieko Hosokawa (born 1929), a Japanese manga artist
Daisuke Hosokawa (born 1982), Japanese swimmer
Fumie Hosokawa (born 1971), Japanese actress
Hajime Hosokawa (1901–1970), Japanese doctor who discovered Minamata disease
Junya Hosokawa (born 1984), Japanese footballer
Kazuhiko Hosokawa (born 1970), Japanese golfer
Kozo Hosokawa (born 1971), Japanese footballer
Naomi Hosokawa (born 1974), Japanese actress
Ritsuo Hosokawa (born 1943), Japanese politician
Sachio Hosokawa (born 1940), Japanese sport shooter
Seika Hosokawa (born 1979), Japanese voice actress
Seiya Hosokawa (born 1988), Japanese baseball player
Shigeki Hosokawa (born 1971), Japanese actor and former model
Shinji Hosokawa (born 1960), Japanese judoka
Takahiro Hosokawa (born 1967), Japanese rugby union player
Takashi Hosokawa (born 1950), Japanese singer
Toru Hosokawa (born 1980), Japanese baseball player
Toshio Hosokawa (born 1955), Japanese composer of contemporary classical music
Toshiyuki Hosokawa (1940–2011), Japanese actor

The Hosokawa clan were a powerful shugo daimyō in Japan.
Hosokawa Akiuji, samurai general in the service of the Ashikaga Northern Court, during Nanboku-cho period
Hosokawa Fujitaka (1534–1610), member of the Ashikaga court
Hosokawa Gracia (1563–1600), childhood name Tama, Japanese noblewoman and wife of Hosokawa Tadaoki
Hosokawa Harumoto (1514–1563), head of Hosokawa clan at the end of the Muromachi period
Hosokawa Katsumoto (1430–1473), one of the Kanrei during Japan's Muromachi Period
Hosokawa Masamoto (1466–1507) a Deputy-Shōgun, sun of Katsumoto
Hosokawa Mitsunao (1619–1650), a daimyō of the early Edo period.
Morihiro Hosokawa (born 1938), 79th Prime Minister of Japan
Morimitsu Hosokawa (born 1972), Japanese potter
Hosokawa Narishige (1755–1810), daimyō of the Edo period
Hosokawa Sumimoto (1489–1520), military commander in the Muromachi period
Hosokawa Sumiyuki (1489–1507), a notable daimyō of the Awa province
Hosokawa Tadaoki (1563–1645), lord of Tango province, son of Hosokawa Fujitaka
Hosokawa Tadatoshi (1586–1641), daimyo of the early Edo period
Hosokawa Takakuni (1484–1531), military commander in the Muromachi period
Hosokawa Tatsutaka (1615–1645), samurai of the early Edo period
Hosokawa Ujitsuna (1514–1564) was a military commander at the end of the Muromachi period

See also 
Hosokawa Micron Powder Systems

Japanese-language surnames